Sarah Te-Biasu (born January 18, 2001) is a Canadian basketball player. She competed at the 2022 Commonwealth Games, in 3x3 basketball, winning a gold medal.

She plays for  Virginia Commonwealth University.

References 

Living people
2001 births
Canadian basketball players
Commonwealth Games gold medallists for Canada
Basketball players at the 2022 Commonwealth Games
Commonwealth Games medallists in basketball
Medallists at the 2022 Commonwealth Games